"Welcome 2 Detroit" is a song by American rappers Trick Trick and Eminem. It was released on November 8, 2005 via Motown/Universal Music Group as the lead single from Trick Trick's debut solo studio album The People vs. written by Trick Trick, Eminem and Luis Resto, it was recorded at Em's home recording studio, at 54 Sound Studios, and at Batcave. Production was handled by Eminem with additional production from Resto. The single peaked at number 100 on the Billboard Hot 100.

Critical reception
DJ Booth wrote a positive review: "With the lead single, 'Welcome 2 Detroit', Trick gets a helping hand from Eminem to help represent his hometown. With a raspy, aggressive voice similar to Ice Cube, Trick shows that he is not going to be yet another Detroit rapper with joke-laden lyrics".

Music video
The music video for "Welcome 2 Detroit" is set in Detroit at The Shelter. It was directed by Davy Duhamel and produced by Jacquie Frisco. It also features cameo appearances by Fat Joe, Proof and the Goon Sqwad.

Track listing

Notes
 signifies an additional producer.

Personnel
Christian Anthony Mathis – songwriter, vocals
Marshall Bruce Mathers III – songwriter & vocals (tracks: 1, 2, 4), engineering & producer (tracks: 1, 2)
Luis Edgardo Resto – songwriter & additional producer (tracks: 1, 2)
Phalon Alexander – vocals & producer (track 3)
Leslie Brathwaite – mixing (track 3)
Mike Strange – recording (track 4)
Tony Campana – recording (track 4)
Davy Duhamel – director (track 4)
Jacquie Frisco – producer (track 4)
Kyle Goen – art direction
Matt Dorfman – design
John Richard – photography

Charts

References

External links

2005 songs
2005 singles
Eminem songs
Motown singles
Trick-Trick songs
Gangsta rap songs
Songs about Detroit
Songs written by Eminem
Song recordings produced by Eminem
Songs written by Luis Resto (musician)